Valeriana alypifolia is a species of plant in the family Caprifoliaceae. It is endemic to Ecuador. Its natural habitat is subtropical or tropical high-altitude grassland.

References

alypifolia
Endemic flora of Ecuador
Least concern plants
Taxonomy articles created by Polbot